Kosmos 862 ( meaning Cosmos 862) was a Soviet US-K missile early warning satellite which was launched in 1976 as part of the Soviet military's Oko programme. The satellite was designed to identify missile launches using optical telescopes and infrared sensors.

Launch 
Kosmos 862 was launched from Site 43/4 at Plesetsk Cosmodrome in the Russian SSR. A Molniya-M carrier rocket with a 2BL upper stage was used to perform the launch, which took place at 09:12 UTC on 22 October 1976.

Orbit 
The launch successfully placed the satellite into a molniya orbit. It subsequently received its Kosmos designation, and the international designator 1976-105A. The United States Space Command assigned it the Satellite Catalog Number 9495.

Podvig says that it self-destructed.

See also

 1976 in spaceflight
 List of Kosmos satellites (751–1000)
 List of Oko satellites
 List of R-7 launches (1975-1979)

References

Kosmos satellites
1976 in spaceflight
1976 in the Soviet Union
Oko
Spacecraft launched by Molniya-M rockets
Spacecraft launched in 1976